Rosa 'Miss All-American Beauty',  (aka MEIdaud ), is a hybrid tea rose cultivar,  developed by  Marie-Louise Meilland in 1965. The cultivar was the recipient of the Portland Gold Medal in 1966 and named an All-America Rose Selections winner in 1968.

Description
'Miss All-American Beauty' is a tall, bushy, upright shrub, 4 to 7 ft (121—213 cm) in height with a 2 to 3 ft (60—90 cm) spread. Blooms are very large, with an average diameter of 6 in (15.24 cm), with 26 to 40 petals. Flowers are a bright pink, with little fading as the blooms age, but will burn in the sun. The rose has a strong, sweet fragrance. 
Blooms open from large, ovoid buds, are high-centered, borne mostly solitary, and have a cupped bloom form. The plant is very prickly and has large, leathery, and dark green leaves that do poorly in dry climates. 'Miss All-American Beauty' blooms in flushes from spring through autumn. The plant does best in USDA zone 7 and warmer.

Awards 
 Portland Gold Medal, (1966)
 All-America Rose Selections, (1968)

See also
Garden roses
Rose Hall of Fame
All-America Rose Selections
List of Award of Garden Merit roses

Notes

References

Miss All-American Beauty